The GMZ-3 (or "Tracked Minelayer-3") is an armoured minelaying vehicle developed for the Engineering Forces of the Soviet Armed Forces. Since the dissolution of the Soviet Union in 1991, it has seen service in several successor states.

History 
The  was introduced in the USSR as early as 1968.

Description 
The GMZ-3 is a tracked minelayer on a GM chassis. The third model was adopted by the USSR Armed Forces in 1984, and is designed for mechanized anti-tank mining during battle. The placement of mines is carried out on the surface of the ground without camouflage or in the ground with camouflage. It has a payload capacity of 208 mines.

Setting up the minefield 
During the establishment of the minefield, cassettes holding four mines of the TM-52, TM-57, TM-62, TM-62PZ or TM-89 types with contact and proximity fuses are fed to the issuing mechanism and further on a release conveyor with a mechanism for transferring mines to a firing position. The plow device with reversed discharges makes it possible to bury and mask mines.

The GMZ-3 provides for the advance installation of minefields in danger zones for tanks, as well as defending against attacks from tanks and mechanized units.

Sub variant

BTRG-127 Bumblebee
In Transnistria at least eight GMZ-3 were inherited from the Soviet army. As there was no need for a minelayer several of these vehicles were converted into armoured personnel carriers. They were first revealed in 2015. The minelaying equipment was removed and infantry seating installed, and an additional weapon station were added to the roof. The weapon station is normally fitted with a Afanasev A-12.7 12.7 mm aircraft machine gun. It is believed to have room for 8-10 soldiers.

Current operators 

  Donetsk People's Republic - captured from Ukraine
  Luhansk People's Republic - captured from Ukraine
 
  - Several converted to APC

Former operators

Notes and references 

Military vehicles of Russia
Military engineering vehicles of the Soviet Union
Uraltransmash products
Tracked armoured fighting vehicles